The United Arab Emirates has quite a close and friendly relationship with the US, being described as the United States' best counter-terrorism ally in the Gulf by Richard A. Clarke, the U.S. national security advisor and counter-terrorism expert. In terms of defense, the United Arab Emirates Armed Forces has been nicknamed "Little Sparta" by United States Armed Forces generals and former U.S. Secretary of Defense James Mattis for its active role against extremists in the Middle East. The United Arab Emirates also hosts the only United States border preclearance in the Middle East.

Diplomatic relations

The United States is the third country to establish formal diplomatic relations with the UAE and has had an ambassador resident in the UAE since 1974. The two countries have enjoyed friendly relations with each other and have developed strong government-to-government ties including close security cooperation. The quality of U.S.-UAE relations increased dramatically as a result of the U.S.-led coalition's campaign to end the Iraqi occupation of Kuwait. UAE ports host more U.S. Navy ships than any port outside the U.S.

In the 2016 United States presidential election, the U.S. Justice Department accused George Nader of providing $3.5 million in illicit campaign donations to Hillary Clinton before the elections and to Donald Trump after he won the elections. According to The New York Times, this was an attempt by the government of United Arab Emirates to influence the election.

Leading the UAE Embassy in Washington, DC is Ambassador Yousef Al Otaiba, who presented his credentials in July 2008.

In December 2018, the UAE reopened its embassy in Damascus to restore ties with the government of Syrian President Bashar al-Assad – a step that the UAE took against the wishes of the US. In January 2019, the UAE hosted a Syrian trade delegation that was led by a businessman, who was on the U.S. Treasury sanctions list since 2011.

On 20 September 2021, the Financial Times reported that the UAE was being squeezed between the competing interests of the United States and China. As the Emirati relations with China were intensifying, the Emirati alliance with the US began to face turbulence. The US raised concerns about the potential security implications of the UAE using Chinese technology, such as Huawei’s 5G telecommunications network. Besides, China has been the biggest buyer of crude oil from the Gulf region. Moreover, it has been broadening its economic and political footprint across the Middle East, which has added some layers of tension to the UAE-US relations.

In November 2021, the US raised a warning for the UAE, alarming the Emirati government of a Chinese military presence in its country that could hinder ties. The US intelligence found that China was secretly building a military facility at a port in Abu Dhabi. Following several American meetings and visits by US officials, the site construction was halted. Despite that, the US officials said that extensive Chinese presence in the UAE could also endanger the planned $23 billion deal of F-35 fighter jets, Reaper drones and other advanced munitions.

On 3 November 2021, the Foreign Policy reported that the policies advanced by the UAE in the Middle East have been destabilising the region, violating international laws and overthrowing attempts for democratic change. The Emirates has also repeatedly attempted to illegally interfere in US domestic politics at the highest levels. This point of view argued that such actions of the UAE have served to harm American interests in the Middle East and at home.

Two UAE-based firms have been named in a criminal complaint for the violation of the International Emergency Economic Powers Act (IEEPA) committed by a dual US-Iran citizen, Kambiz Attar Kashani. Kashani’s criminal complaint was filed in the federal court of Brooklyn for conspiring to illegally export US goods, services, and technology to the people of Iran and the government of Iran in association with two UAE-based front companies. The defendant allegedly used the two Dubai-based front organizations in order to procure items from more than one US technology firm. Kashani reportedly carried out the illegal transshipping scheme through the UAE front companies from February 2019 through to June 2021. The prime defendant, Kashani, and his co-conspirators intentionally concealed from the source US companies that the products and services will be sent to Iran, by fraudulently portraying that the end-users would be the said UAE front companies.

The United States sanctioned a UAE-based firm along with multiple Asian firms for aiding the illegal trading of millions of dollars worth of Iranian oil to East Asia. The UAE firm involved namely, Blue Cactus Heavy Equipment and Machinery Spare Parts Trading was sanctioned by the Treasury Department’s Office of Foreign Assets Control on 1 August 2022 for its assistance in petroleum trade on the behalf of an Iranian company, coincidentally a week before OPEC+ meetings. The Treasury Department did not comment on whether the penalties were potential enough to impact US’ need to acquire increased oil production from the UAE. US President Joe Biden’s administration used an August 2018 executive order as the authority for imposing the sanctions. The executive order was signed into existence by Donald Trump.

In 2018, a UAE princess, a US-French dual national and others were arrested by Indian and UAE soldiers in the Arabian sea, a few kilometres off the coast of India. The princess, Latifa bin Mohammed Al Maktoum, was then sent back to the UAE. She wanted to escape the oppressive UAE government. After the incident, there was a lot of criticism.

Economic relations 

US prosecutors in 2016 alleged that Dubai-based Gunes General Trading carried out suspicious transactions totalling $142 million, using the UAE financial system during 2011 and 2012, the BBC found and reported on 20 September 2020. U.S. prosecutors accused the Dubai-based trading firm of being part of a network that was under the control of a Turkish-Iranian gold trader, Reza Zarrab. The network allegedly coordinated the transaction worth millions of dollars for the Iranian government and other US-sanctioned entities belonging to Iran.

On 19 August 2020, the Trump administration sanctioned two companies registered in the United Arab Emirates over their work for an Iranian airline, Mahan Air. The airline has been subject to U.S. counter-terrorism sanctions since 2019 for its support to Iran's Islamic Revolutionary Guard Corps, which the State Department has designated as a foreign terrorist organization. The sanctions targeted UAE-based Parthia Cargo and Delta Parts Supply, along with Parthia's owner, Amin Mahdavi.

Bilateral Nuclear Cooperation Agreement

On January 15, 2009, Sheikh Abdullah bin Zayed Al Nahyan, Foreign Minister of the United Arab Emirates, and U.S. Secretary of State Condoleezza Rice signed a bilateral agreement for peaceful nuclear cooperation that enhances international standards of nuclear non-proliferation.

President Barack Obama subsequently endorsed the agreement and submitted it to Congress on May 20, 2009, for the mandatory 90-day review. After a hearing on Capitol Hill in July 2009, leaders of the House Foreign Affairs and Senate Foreign Relations Committees issued resolutions supporting the US-UAE nuclear cooperation agreement."

Military

The United States maintains three military bases in the United Arab Emirates. The three bases are Al Dhafra Air Base, Al Minhad Air Base, and the Fujairah Naval Base. A major military hospital modelled on the central American medical facility in Germany, Landstuhl Regional Medical Center, is also being built in the UAE which will be operated by the United States Army, United States Department of Defense, and the United Arab Emirates Armed Forces.

According to Richard A. Clarke, then U.S. National Coordinator for Security, Infrastructure Protection and Counter-terrorism and a contributor in the 9/11 Commission Report, the UAE is the United States' best counter-terrorism ally in the Gulf. According to previous U.S. ambassador to UAE Richard G. Olson, Deputy Commander of the UAE Armed Forces Mohammed bin Zayed Al Nahyan structured the UAE Armed forces to be closely aligned with the U.S. military.

The United Arab Emirates Armed Forces are the only Arab country to commit military troops for humanitarian aid missions in the US-led War in Afghanistan. The UAE military is nicknamed "Little Sparta" by United States Armed Forces Generals and specifically by former U.S. defense secretary James Mattis due to its active and effective military role, particularly in the War on Terrorism, despite its small active personnel. Mattis has also called the UAE led 2016 Battle of Mukalla operation a model for American troops, referencing how the United Arab Emirates Armed Forces liberated the port of Mukalla from Al-Qaeda in the Arabian Peninsula forces in 36 hours after being held by AQAP for more than a year. Prior to joining the Trump administration, Mattis received permission from the U.S. military after retiring from the Marine Corps to work as a military adviser to the United Arab Emirates Armed Forces.

The United Arab Armed Forces also receive defense advice from two former top U.S. military commanders, former Secretary of Defense James Mattis and General John R. Allen, a retired United States Marine Corps four-star general and former commander of the NATO International Security Assistance Force.

On 4 February 2019, a CNN investigation found out that the U.S. weapons, which were sold to UAE and Saudi Arabia, ended up in the hands of al Qaeda fighters, hardline Salafi militias and other militants waging war in Yemen. The investigation also unveiled that UAE and Saudi Arabia used US-made weapons in form of currency to buy the loyalties of militias.

Through a partnership with the United States, the United Arab Emirates has spearheaded an active role in fighting against AQAP and ISIL-YP in Yemen. On 26 February 2019, U.S. President Donald Trump publicly thanked the United Arab Emirates on his Twitter for the UAE's effort in rescuing Danny Burch, a U.S. citizen who was held in captivity for 18 months by militants in Yemen. In late 2020, it was reported that the Trump administration would sell the UAE an estimated $10 billion of F-35 jets and $2.9 billion of armed MQ-9B drones.

Based on a November 2020 report by Amnesty International, United States’ decision to sell 18 armed MQ-9B aerial drones worth approximately $2.9 billion to the United Arab Emirates could result in increasing civilian deaths in Yemen and Libya. Since March 2015, UAE, as part of the Saudi-led coalition has carried out several air strikes in Yemen. Amnesty International has visited and investigated dozens of sites in eight governorates, targeted in UAE air strikes as part of the Saudi-led coalition, and repeatedly found remnants of munitions manufactured by the United States.
 On 10 November 2020, Donald Trump’s administration formally notified the Congress regarding the pending sale of 50 stealth F-35 fighter jets to the United Arab Emirates, as a part of the US’  broad arms deal worth $23 billion. The deal included 50 F-35s, 18 advanced armed drone systems and a package of air-to-air and air-to-ground munitions. The F-35 sale to the UAE raised concerns, as its military capability was already one of the most advances in the Middle East, which was evident in the Emirates’ involvement in active conflict zones like Yemen, Syria and Libya.

The Senate Appropriations Committee demanded the State Department to ensure that the F-35 deal with the United Arab Emirates must not threaten Israel's military edge or make U.S. military systems vulnerable to military threats posed by Russia and China. In a report published by the Amnesty International on 9 November 2020, possible threats linked to Washington selling advanced weaponry and aircraft to the UAE were cited, in light of the Gulf nation's breach of arms embargo in Libya and international humanitarian law in Yemen.

On 30 November 2020, a group of 29 non-governmental organizations undersigned a letter written to the Congress and State Department to halt a proposed $23 billion arms sale to the United Arab Emirates, which included advanced F-35 fighter jets, armed drones and bombs. According to the letter the key reason to demand blocking this deal was the civilian casualties caused by the UAE's intervention in Libya and Yemen. The new administration of Joe Biden had announced in April 2021 that it would go ahead with the arms deal. However, within a month, concerns were raised by the US officials, citing the growing ties between China and the UAE.

In January 2021, the UAE signed a weapons deal worth $23 billion, including F-35 fighter jets and MQ-9B UAVs, with the US. In May 2021, two Chinese planes were spotted by the US spy agencies unloading unidentified materiel in the Emirates. In the wake of such concerns, the US officials presented three requests to the UAE: that the Emirates must ensure that no other country, particularly China, gets access to the US’ F-35 and drone technology; that the qualitative military edge of Israel is maintained; and that the weapons must not be used in Yemen and Libya, the war-torn countries where the UAE was involved in offensives. In June 2021, the Biden administration raised another concern with the UAE. The US asked the Emirates to remove the Chinese Huawei Technologies Co. from its telecommunications network within four years before the UAE was scheduled to receive the F-35 jets in 2026 to 2027. The Emirates asked for a longer time to look for an affordable alternative, while the US called for the UAE to distance itself from China. However, by December, the UAE suspended discussions over the arms deal with Washington. In December 2021, the United Arab Emirates unilaterally suspended talks with the US regarding the procurement, stating that technical requirements, sovereign operational restrictions, and cost/benefit analysis led to the re-assessment and suspension of the deal. Two months later, the UAE turned away from the US and indulged in talks with China for military hardware, including L-15 aircraft. In 2017, UAE had also obtained Wing Loong II drones from China, but the numbers were not disclosed.

In February 2023, the US administration put pressure on the UAE’s and Egypt’s government to pursue the military leaders of Libya and Sudan to expel the Wagner Group from their regions. In January 2023, the US government had expanded sanctions on Russia’s Wagner Group, along with related companies and individuals, including some in Central African Republic and the United Arab Emirates. The US’s decision came after the group’s expanding role in Russia’s war in Ukraine.

United States border pre-clearance

The United Arab Emirates is one of the few countries and the only one in the Middle East which has a U.S. border pre-clearance that are staffed and operated by U.S. Customs and Border Protection (CBP) officers, allowing travelers from Abu Dhabi International Airport to reach the United States as domestic U.S. travelers. The U.S. customs pre-clearance facility at Abu Dhabi International Airport officially opened on January 26, 2014. U.S. customs pre-clearance is currently being planned at Dubai International Airport.

Intelligence
According to Reuters, U.S. intelligence operatives from the National Security Agency (NSA) helped the United Arab Emirates National Electronic Security Authority (NESA) engage in surveillance of terrorists, other governments, militants, human rights activists, and dissidents in a collaborative project called Project Raven. The project helped break up an ISIS network within the Emirates as well as assess if other attacks were imminent after the ISIS inspired Murder of Ibolya Ryan in Abu Dhabi. According to Lori Stroud, one of the former NSA intelligence analysts, Americans were also targeted for surveillance. The New York Times reported that as a result, Mozilla rejected Abu Dhabi-based cybersecurity firm DarkMatter – linked to Project Raven – from administering online website security certificates.

The United States Central Intelligence Agency does not gather human intelligence about the UAE as it does on almost every other nation where the United States has significant interests.

In November 2022, the U.S. intelligence compiled a classified report detailing extensive efforts by the UAE to steer U.S. foreign policy in its favor and manipulate the American political system, through a series of legal and illegal exploits. As per the records, the UAE has spent hundreds of millions of dollars on donations to American universities and think tanks, many that produce policy papers with findings favorable to UAE's interests.

Sister-Twinning cities
  Abu Dhabi and  Houston, Texas (2002)
  Dubai and  Detroit, Michigan (2003)

See also

 Foreign relations of the United Arab Emirates
 Foreign relations of the United States
 Americans in the United Arab Emirates
 Emirati Americans

References

External links
History of United Arab Emirates - U.S. relations
Embassy of U.A.E - Washington, DC
Embassy of U.S.A. - Abu Dhabi
Consulate General of U.S.A. - Dubai
U.A.E.-U.S. Relations

 
United States
Bilateral relations of the United States